Crowd control is a public security practice in which large crowds are managed in order to prevent the outbreak of crowd crushes, affray, fights involving drunk and disorderly people or riots. Crowd crushes in particular can cause many hundreds of fatalities. Effective crowd management is about managing expected and unexpected crowd occurrences. Crowd control can involve privately hired security guards as well as police officers. Crowd control is often used at large, public gatherings like street fairs, music festivals, stadiums and public demonstrations. At some events, security guards and police use metal detectors and sniffer dogs to prevent weapons and drugs being brought into a venue.

Equipment 
Materials such as stanchions, crowd control barriers, fences and decals painted on the ground can be used to direct a crowd. A common method of crowd control is to use high visibility fencing to divert and corral pedestrian traffic to safety when there is any potential threat for danger. Keeping the crowd comfortable and relaxed is also essential, so things like awnings, cooling fans (in hot weather), and entertainment are sometimes used as well. Thus, restrictive measures and the application of force can actually make crowding more dangerous, for instance during the Hillsborough disaster. For controlling riots and demonstrations, see riot control.

Specific products that are used to implement line management and public guidance in high traffic areas include retractable belt systems (which incorporate a stanchion post and the retractable tape) and wall mount systems (also incorporating a retractable belt but are surface mounted). Post and rope systems are also popular, especially in banks and theaters.

History 
The history of crowd control starts back in the 1920s, where there was no official crowd control unit. There would be ten to 20 officers lined up. Behind one line there would be another line about twenty feet back. The officers were armed with batons and axe handles. Their job is to simply hold the crowd back, which would end in a free for all and resulting in multiple officer injuries.

Later in the 1950s, the first actual riot control teams armed with riot shields and batons. The goal was for the riot shield officers to hold up the lines. When they came to actual contact with the crowd the officers with the batons were supposed to help the riot shield officers. However, if deadly force was used against them there was no training or procedure to counter this. The officers at this point were left to fend for themselves.

The 1960s and 1970s marked the invention and widespread use of the tear gas. However, with this new innovation the officers were not used to operating in an environment where visibility was limited. The armor that they wore at the time was not as mobile. This resulting in that type of armor being rarely used.

A crowd controller is also another name for a bouncer or doorman.

See also

References

External links
 Managing a crowd - illustrated article with crowd management tips and tricks
 uCrowds: an example of a crowd simulation software package